Stefan Maderer (born 1 September 1996) is a German footballer who plays as a striker for  club SpVgg Bayreuth.

Club career
Maderer is a youth exponent from SpVgg Greuther Fürth. He made his 2. Bundesliga debut on 27 November 2015 against 1. FC Kaiserslautern. He replaced Niko Gießelmann after 85 minutes.

Honours
SpVgg Bayreuth
 Regionalliga Bayern: 2021–22

References

1996 births
Living people
Sportspeople from Erlangen
German footballers
2. Bundesliga players
3. Liga players
Regionalliga players
1. FC Nürnberg players
FSV Frankfurt players
SpVgg Bayreuth players
Association football midfielders
Footballers from Bavaria